George Peter Brown (born 4 June 1999) is a professional footballer who plays as a full-back for Liga 1 club Persebaya Surabaya.

Career

Early career
Growing up, Brown played youth football for Hutton and Brentwood Athletic. In 2017, he enrolled at Ashland University in the United States and played college football for five seasons.

Club career
In December 2022, Brown signed a two-year deal with Liga 1 side Persebaya Surabaya. On 18 January 2023, he made his professional debut as a substitute in a 5–0 win over Persita.

Personal life
Brown was born in England to an English father and Indonesian mother. His brother is fellow footballer Jack Alan Brown. He attended Brentwood School in Essex growing up.

References

External links

1999 births
Living people
English footballers
Association football defenders
English people of Indonesian descent
Ashland Eagles men's soccer players
Persebaya Surabaya players
Liga 1 (Indonesia) players
British Asian footballers
English expatriate footballers
English expatriate sportspeople in the United States
Expatriate soccer players in the United States
English expatriate sportspeople in Indonesia
Expatriate footballers in Indonesia
Indonesian expatriate footballers